Blake Shapen (born January 21, 2001) is an American football quarterback for the Baylor Bears.

Early life and high school
Shapen grew up in Shreveport, Louisiana and attended Evangel Christian Academy. He passed for 2,049 yards with 24 touchdowns and five interceptions and also rushed for 324 yards with five touchdowns. Shapen committed to play both baseball and football at Arizona State over offers from Ole Miss, Arizona, Louisiana-Lafayette, and Arkansas State, but later de-committed. He later committed to play at Baylor as a two-sport athlete.

College career
Shapen redshirted his true freshman season. He entered his redshirt freshman season as the backup to starting quarterback Gerry Bohanon. Shapen saw his first serious playing time late in the season in a 20-10 win against Kansas State after Bohannon suffered a hamstring injury. He made his first career start the following week against Texas Tech and completed 20 of 34 pass attempts for 254 yards and two touchdowns in a 27-24 victory. Shapen also started the 2021 Big 12 Championship Game and was named the game's MVP after passing for 180 yards and three touchdowns in a 21-16 win over Oklahoma State. He finished the season with a 72.1% completion percentage for 596 yards with five touchdowns and no interceptions.

Shapen won the starting quarterback job for 2022 during spring practices.

Statistics

References

External links
Baylor Bears profile

Living people
Players of American football from Shreveport, Louisiana
American football quarterbacks
Baylor Bears football players
2001 births
Evangel Christian Academy alumni